Daniil Pavlovich Pakhomov; born 5 August 1998) is a Russian swimmer.

He won four gold medals in (200 m, 100 m butterfly, 4 × 100 m medley and 4 × 100 m mixed medley) and breaking a new Junior World record in 100m butterfly at the 2015 European Games.

Career
In June 2015, 16-year-old Pakhomov was selected to compete at the inaugural 2015 European Games in Baku, Pakhomov won four gold medals, in (200m, 100 m butterfly), in 4 × 100 m mixed medley (with Anton Chupkov, Arina Openysheva and Maria Kameneva at a time of 3:49.53) and in 4 × 100 m medley (with Anton Chupkov, Vladislav Kozlov and Filipp Shopin touching in at 3:36.38), a new junior world record breaking the previous record held by Russia in 3:38.02 at the 2014 Youth Olympics. Pakhomov also broke a new junior world record in 100m butterfly.

On August 2–9, Pakhomov appeared in his first seniors at the 2015 World Championships in Kazan, competing with Russian Team in 4 × 100 m mixed medley (with Yulia Efimova, Vladimir Morozov, and Anastasia Fesikova) where they finished 5th and in men's 4 × 100 m medley (with Kirill Prigoda, Evgeny Rylov, and Vladimir Morozov) also finishing 5th in the finals.

On August 25–30, Pakhomov then competed at the 2015 World Junior Championships in Singapore, he took individual medals winning gold in men's 100 m butterfly (52.28, a meet record), silver in 200 m butterfly and bronze in 50 m butterfly. In Team events, Pakhomov also competed in 4 × 100 m mixed medley (with Anton Chupkov, Irina Pridhoko and Arina Openysheva) were Russia threw in a new Junior World record touching in at 3:45.85 and in men's 4x100 medley (with Anton Chupkov, Vladislav Kozlov, Roman Larin, touching in 3:36.44), taking a meets record.

References

External links
 
Daniil Pakhomov Sports bio

1998 births
Living people
Sportspeople from Arkhangelsk
Russian male swimmers
Male butterfly swimmers
Male medley swimmers
Olympic swimmers of Russia
Swimmers at the 2016 Summer Olympics
European Games gold medalists for Russia
European Games medalists in swimming
Swimmers at the 2015 European Games
European Games bronze medalists for Russia
Medalists at the FINA World Swimming Championships (25 m)
World Aquatics Championships medalists in swimming